Leonard Gardner (born 3 November 1933) is an American novelist, short story writer, and screenwriter. His writing has appeared in The Paris Review, Esquire, The Southwest Review, and other publications, and he has been awarded a Guggenheim Fellowship.

Gardner was born in Stockton, and went to San Francisco State University. He currently  in Larkspur, California.

Gardner's 1969 novel Fat City is an American classic whose stature has increased over the years. His screen adaptation of Fat City was made into an acclaimed 1972 film of the same title, directed by John Huston. The book and movie are set in and around Stockton and concern the struggles of third-rate pro boxers who only dimly comprehend that none of them will ever make the big time. Devoid of the usual "sweet science" cliches, the book roils with dark pessimism as the characters eke out a gritty existence. It is considered an underappreciated classic of early 1970s cinema. In their memoirs, producer Ray Stark and director John Huston both cited it as among their finest achievements.

Gardner adapted his short story "Jesus Christ Has Returned to Earth and Appears Here Nightly" into the screenplay for the low-budget 1989 film Valentino Returns. He has a small part in the film, playing a character named Lyle.

Gardner has made a couple of other acting appearances, most notably in Francis Ford Coppola's 1988 film Tucker: The Man and His Dream. Gardner appears in a handful of scenes as a character known only as the Gas Station Owner.

He has written a number of screenplays for television, including several for NYPD Blue, for which he was a writer and producer for a few seasons.

References

External links

 Website of Fat City Boxing Club

1933 births
Living people
20th-century American novelists
American male novelists
American male screenwriters
Television producers from California
Writers from Stockton, California
People from Larkspur, California
San Francisco State University alumni
20th-century American male writers
Novelists from California
Screenwriters from California